HSHS may refer to:
 Hamilton Southeastern High School, Fishers, Indiana, United States
 Helensvale State High School, Helensvale, Queensland, Australia
 Henry-Senachwine High School, Henry, Illinois, United States
 Highland Springs High School, Highland Springs, Virginia, United States
 Hinsdale South High School, Darien, Illinois, United States
 Holy Spirit High School (disambiguation)
 Holly Springs High School, Holly Springs, North Carolina, United States
 Hot Springs High School (Arkansas), Hot Springs, Arkansas, United States
 Hot Springs High School (Montana), Hot Springs, Montana, United States
 Hospital Sisters Health System, Springfield, Illinois, United States